Paragagrella is a genus of harvestmen in the family Sclerosomatidae from South and Southeast Asia.

Species
 Paragagrella basalis Roewer, 1929
 Paragagrella brevispina Banks, 1930
 Paragagrella mysorea Roewer, 1939
 Paragagrella roeweri Giltay, 1930
 Paragagrella typus Roewer, 1912

References

Harvestmen
Harvestman genera